Callum Miles Rowe (born 2 September 1999) is an English professional footballer who plays as a midfielder or left-back currently for Stourbridge.

Career

Aston Villa
Born in Leicester, Rowe was named in the Aston Villa starting line-up for his senior debut on 8 January 2021 in an FA Cup third round tie against Liverpool after "a large number of first-team players and staff" tested positive for COVID-19, rendering Villa's first-team squad unavailable for the match. Villa exceeded expectations by losing just 4–1, with Rowe providing the assist for Louie Barry to score their only goal in the 41st minute.

On 16 January 2021, Rowe joined Hereford in the National League North on loan for the rest of the season. He made his Hereford debut on 20 January, in a 2–0 victory at Stamford in the FA Trophy. On 18 February 2021, the National League North season was ended early, with the season being declared null & void - due to a resurgence of the COVID-19 pandemic in the UK. Rowe stayed on loan with Hereford to take part in their FA Trophy campaign which was ongoing. However, Rowe did not feature in the Hereford squad that lost the final 3–1 to Hornchurch at Wembley Stadium.

On 4 June 2021, Rowe was released by Aston Villa.

Exeter City
On 28 June 2021, Callum Rowe signed for Exeter City in League Two. He made his league debut on 14 August 2021 as a substitute in a 3–0 defeat to Leyton Orient.

On 10 November 2021, Rowe joined National League South side Chippenham Town on a short-term loan until 7 December. He made his Chippenham debut in a 3–0 victory over Billericay Town on 13 November.

On 25 January 2022, Rowe returned to the National League South, joining Bath City on loan until the end of the season. He made his Bath debut the same day as his transfer was announced, losing 4–0 to Hampton & Richmond Borough. Rowe was released by Exeter at the end of the 2021–22 season following their promotion.

Following his release from Exeter, Rowe began training with Scottish Championship team Dundee, and appeared in a pre-season friendly against Blackburn Rovers on 13 July 2022.

Yeovil Town
On 26 August 2022, Rowe signed for National League side Yeovil Town on a short-term deal.

On 4 November 2022, Rowe left Yeovil Town after his short-term deal expired.

Salisbury
On 5 November 2022, Rowe signed for Salisbury, and made his debut later that day in a 3–1 defeat against Weston-super-Mare.

Return to Hereford 
On 12 November 2022, Rowe returned to Hereford, and made his second debut for the club the same day in a 1–0 win at AFC Telford. He was released on 9 January 2023 after making only two league appearances.

Stourbridge
On 24 February 2023, Rowe signed for Southern League Premier Division Central side Stourbridge.

Career statistics

References

External links
 

1999 births
Living people
Footballers from Leicester
English footballers
Association football defenders
Aston Villa F.C. players
Black British sportsmen
Hereford F.C. players
Exeter City F.C. players
Chippenham Town F.C. players
Bath City F.C. players
Yeovil Town F.C. players
Salisbury F.C. players
English Football League players
National League (English football) players
Southern Football League players